Kanny Theng (born March 10) is a Singaporean model, actress and TV Host. She is the brand ambassador for Hakubi White C Sato Pharmaceutical Canada Inc. She has been bought up as an Online Game Ambassador Monster Forest for Asiasoft Singapore. Her most recent appearance as a Female Lead of New Year Blockbuster Movie Take 2 as a Social Worker.  She is also an abstract artist with several art representative and exhibitions. With the art gallery KA’TE’Q Galleria.

Filmography

Film

Television series

References

External links
SATO Brand Ambassador
Jteam Singapore Jack Neo The Lionmen2 Song by Bunzbox

External links
Kanny Theng Blog

Living people
Singaporean people of Chinese descent
Singaporean female models
Singaporean television personalities
Singaporean television actresses
Year of birth missing (living people)